Ottenhofen (Oberbayern) station is a railway station in the municipality of Ottenhofen, located in the Erding district in Upper Bavaria, Germany.

References

Munich S-Bahn stations
Railway stations in Bavaria
Railway stations in Germany opened in 1862
1862 establishments in Bavaria
Buildings and structures in Erding (district)